Liwayway Vinzons-Chato (born December 31, 1945) is a Filipino politician. A member of the Liberal Party, she was elected as a Member of the House of Representatives, representing the Lone District of Camarines Norte from 2007 to 2010.

A graduate of the University of the Philippines College of Law, Vinzons-Chato served as Commissioner of the Bureau of Internal Revenue during the administration of President Fidel Ramos. In 2001, she was an unsuccessful candidate for election to the Philippine Senate under Reporma-LM and the banner of the People Power Coalition allied with President Gloria Macapagal Arroyo.

In 2007, she ran for representative for Camarines Norte and won. She lost re-election in 2010 when she ran for the newly split 2nd district.

References

 

Filipino women lawyers
People from Camarines Norte
University of the Philippines alumni
1945 births
Bicolano politicians
Living people
Bicolano people
Liberal Party (Philippines) politicians
Members of the House of Representatives of the Philippines from Camarines Norte
Independent politicians in the Philippines
Ramos administration personnel
20th-century Filipino lawyers